Andrey Lyasyuk (born 14 April 1983) is a Belarusian professional footballer, who currently plays for Stenles Pinsk.

Career
Born in Pinsk, Lyasyuk began playing football in FC Dinamo Brest's youth system. He joined the senior team and made his Belarusian Premier League debut in 2001.

In August 2016, Lyasyuk joined A Lyga club Kauno Žalgiris. After the season he left the club and joined I Lyga side Nevėžis.

References

External links

1983 births
Living people
Belarusian footballers
Association football forwards
Belarusian expatriate footballers
Expatriate footballers in Lithuania
Belarusian expatriate sportspeople in Lithuania
A Lyga players
FC Dynamo Brest players
FC Volna Pinsk players
FC Neman Grodno players
FC Minsk players
FC Dnepr Mogilev players
FC Gomel players
FC Gorodeya players
FK Kauno Žalgiris players
FK Nevėžis players
FC Lida players
FC Belshina Bobruisk players
Sportspeople from Pinsk